Víctor Fernández Braulio (born 28 November 1960) is a Spanish football manager.

He had three spells with his hometown team Zaragoza, winning the Copa del Rey in 1994 and the Cup Winners' Cup a year later. He also led Tenerife, Celta, Betis and Deportivo La Coruña in La Liga, and won the Intercontinental Cup in a brief spell at Porto in 2004.

Football career

Zaragoza
Fernández was born in Zaragoza, Aragon. Late into the 1990–91 season, aged only 30, he was promoted to hometown Real Zaragoza's first team, eventually leading it to the 17th league position and avoiding La Liga relegation in the playoffs against Real Murcia; at the time of his beginnings, he was the second youngest manager to ever coach in the league after Xabier Azkargorta.

In the following years, Fernández helped Zaragoza consolidate in the top division, notably reconverting Gustavo Poyet from forward to attacking midfielder and winning the Copa del Rey in 1994 and the UEFA Cup Winners' Cup in the next season. He was relieved of his duties on 8 November 1996, meeting the same fate the following year with his next club, CD Tenerife.

Celta
In May 1998, Fernández was appointed to replace Javier Irureta at RC Celta de Vigo, Profiting from the recent Bosman ruling, his team fielded many European Union players such as Claude Makélélé, as well as those from further afield such as the Israeli Haim Revivo and Russian midfield duo Valeri Karpin and Aleksandr Mostovoi; the Galician team played highly attractive football and were known as EuroCelta for their performances in continental competitions.

Fernández led Celta in the UEFA Cup in each of his four seasons, reaching the quarter-finals on all but one occasion; highlights included a 3–1 win over Liverpool in November 1998, a 7–0 rout of S.L. Benfica a year later and a 4–0 victory at Juventus F.C. in March 2000. His team won the UEFA Intertoto Cup in the summer of 2000, with a 4–3 aggregate defeat of FC Zenit Saint Petersburg. Domestically, he surprisingly lost the 2001 Copa del Rey Final 3–1 to Zaragoza, who had barely avoided relegation.

Betis
Fernández was appointed at fellow top flight team Real Betis in May 2002, after the exit of Juande Ramos. He finished eighth and ninth respectively in his two years, and his team were eliminated from the third round of the UEFA Cup by AJ Auxerre in his first campaign.

Porto
In August 2004, Fernández moved abroad and joined Portuguese club FC Porto; the UEFA Champions League holders had dismissed Luigi Delneri before a single competitive game. He won on his debut on 20 August in the Supertaça Cândido de Oliveira, with new signing Ricardo Quaresma scoring the only goal of a win against rivals Benfica; on 12 December he added the conquest of the last ever Intercontinental Cup with a penalty shootout victory over Colombia's Once Caldas.

Domestically, Fernández's team gave up their Primeira Liga lead to Benfica on 20 November 2004 when they lost 1–0 at home to neighbours Boavista FC. Home form was a struggle with three wins from the first seven fixtures, including another single-goal defeat to S.C. Beira-Mar two weeks later. He was abruptly dismissed the following January following a 1–3 defeat to S.C. Braga, again at the Estádio do Dragão.

Returns to Zaragoza and Betis
Fernández returned to his beloved Zaragoza for the 2006–07 campaign, qualifying the side for the UEFA Cup in his first year but being sacked midway through his second, as the season eventually ended in relegation.

In another return, Fernández joined Betis in late January 2010, replacing fired Antonio Tapia. During his spell the Verdiblancos were the team in the league with the most points, but they missed out on promotion from Segunda División after being beaten to promotion places through head-to-head against Hércules CF and Levante UD, despite beating the latter 4–0 on the final day.

Later years
On 9 January 2013, Fernández moved for his second experience abroad, signing a contract with Belgium's K.A.A. Gent. He was sacked on 30 September 2013, due to poor results.

Fernández was appointed as the new manager of Deportivo de La Coruña on 10 July 2014, succeeding Fernando Vázquez. He was relieved of his duties on 9 April of the following year, with the team eventually narrowly escaping relegation.

In the summer of 2015, Fernández signed for Real Madrid as youth system coordinator. He left the Santiago Bernabéu Stadium in 2017, and on 17 December 2018 he returned to Zaragoza for a third stint as manager replacing the dismissed Lucas Alcaraz.

Fernández resigned on 18 August 2020, after losing the play-off semi-finals to Elche CF.

Managerial statistics

Honours
Zaragoza
Copa del Rey: 1993–94
UEFA Cup Winners' Cup: 1994–95

Celta
UEFA Intertoto Cup: 2000

Porto
Supertaça Cândido de Oliveira: 2004
Intercontinental Cup: 2004

References

External links

1960 births
Living people
Sportspeople from Zaragoza
Spanish footballers
Footballers from Aragon
Association football midfielders
Tercera División players
Spanish football managers
La Liga managers
Segunda División managers
Segunda División B managers
Real Zaragoza managers
CD Tenerife managers
RC Celta de Vigo managers
Real Betis managers
Deportivo de La Coruña managers
Primeira Liga managers
FC Porto managers
Belgian Pro League managers
K.A.A. Gent managers
Spanish expatriate football managers
Expatriate football managers in Portugal
Expatriate football managers in Belgium
Spanish expatriate sportspeople in Portugal
Spanish expatriate sportspeople in Belgium
Real Madrid CF non-playing staff